Atractus major, the brown ground snake or big ground snake,  is a species of snake in the family Colubridae. The species can be found in Ecuador, Venezuela, Brazil, Peru, and Colombia.

References 

Atractus
Reptiles of Ecuador
Reptiles of Venezuela
Reptiles of Brazil
Reptiles of Peru
Reptiles of Colombia
Reptiles described in 1894
Taxa named by George Albert Boulenger